The Killing of the Imam  is a 2010 South African short documentary film.

Synopsis 
In 1969, Imam Abdullah Haron was incarcerated and killed in detention in Cape Town, South Africa. A much loved community leader, he was active within an inactive community in raising awareness of the plight of his compatriots living under apartheid. During the 60s, Imam Haron became more active and began travelling abroad to raise funds for impoverished families back home. Mixing animation, documentary and stock footage, this short film looks at the last few years of the Imam's life and death. It is told by his grandson, the filmmaker, through the eyes of a child.

Awards 
 SAFTA 2011

External links

2010 films
South African short documentary films
2010 short documentary films
Documentary films about apartheid